Košarkaški klub BFC, commonly referred to as KK BFC or simply BFC Beočin, was a men's professional basketball club based in Beočin, Serbia, FR Yugoslavia. The club competed in the top-tier Yugoslav League from 1993 to 1997.

History
The club finished the 1995–96 YUBA League season as the runner-up, lost the Play-off Finals from Partizan. The club also played at the FIBA EuroCup in the 1996–97 season. 

In 1997, the club was merged into Vojvodina.

Head coaches

  Boško Đokić
  Miroslav Nikolić (1994–1996)
  Goran Miljković (1996–1997)

Notable players 

  Vladimir Kuzmanović
  Milan Marinković 
  Milenko Topić
  Željko Topalović
Youth system
  Darko Miličić
 Marko Jeremić

Season by season

International record

References

External links 
 Basketaški snovi cementnog grada: legenda o BFC Beočinu

Defunct basketball teams in Serbia
Basketball teams in Yugoslavia
Basketball teams established in 1970
Basketball teams disestablished in 1997
Beočin
1970 establishments in Serbia